Georgian profanity refers to inflammatory vulgar, obscene or profane language in Georgian that some of the words and phrases even evolved into a modern Georgian slang. For exact and comprehensive pronunciation of words and phrases, especially ones written with the apostrophes, the rules of Romanization of Georgian and IPA are essential.

The Georgian Orthodox Church and Catholicos-Patriarch Ilia II of Georgia have traditionally been very critical of Georgian profanity, describing it as "words of death and Satan", that will result in "severe punishment by God". After the Orthodox Christmas of 2019, then-Chairperson of the Parliament of Georgia Irakli Kobakhidze suggested to make Georgian profanity punishable and forbidden by law, but then-Minister of Justice of Georgia Thea Tsulukiani ruled out such a scenario saying "that very law will put us all in prison, so it should stay protected by the freedom of expression".

Body parts
 dick.
 Hey you stupid! Literally "you, dick!". 
 extremely stupid person. Literally "The dickest of dicks". 
 stupid person. Literally "son of a dick".
 stupid person.
 stupid person.
 dick-head. 
 stupid person. Literally "penis smegma". 
 describes a moment when a person falls. Literally "one that became a dick-head".
 I don't give a fuck! Literally meaning "it can go to my dick!".
 I don't give a fuck! Literally meaning "it hangs on my dick". 
 stupid deed, or low quality thing. 
 a stupid girl, woman. Literally "dick woman". 
 stupid person.
 stupid person. 
 little dick.
 little dick.
 testicle, ball.
 literally meaning "I adore your balls" can be used as an expression of admiration from a parent to a son.
 cunt, pussy.
 expressing admiration when seeing extremely beautiful and sexually attractive woman. Literally "wow, what a pussy!".
 a person who performs cunnilingus. Literally "one who sucks the pussy".
 I will beat the shit out of you! Literally "I'll turn you into a pussy". 
 cunt, pussy of a young girl.
 tits, breast.
 tits. (used in more rural areas).
 ass.
 a brave person.  Literally "someone with an ass".
 shitty. 
 a coward. Literally "someone without an ass".
 kiss my ass! 
 you're such a pain in the ass!
 I worked my ass off.
 gay male. Literally meaning "ass-er" i.e. someone who goes after ass.
 No way! Literally "don't act as an ass".
 somewhere very far. Literally "somewhere in the ass".

Bodily functions

 shit, diarrhea.
 a weak person or a coward.
 one that shits himself. 
 a person who is easily frightened or intimidated.
 fuck off! Literally meaning "shit off".
 one that pisses himself.
 a person who is easily frightened and intimidated.
 shit.
 fart.
 means "one that ran away cowardly" (literally means "sneak out like a fart").
 a coward (literally means "Someone who farts").

Sexual
 to fuck. Words and phrases derived from it are the most used.
 I fucked your mother!
 I fucked the pussy of your mother! 
 I fucked the ass of your mother! 
 I fucked your origin!
 Literally "mother-fucked", that may mean a dangerous person who can do bad, harmful and unpredictable things.
 Literally "one mother-fucked", that may mean a dangerous person who can do bad, harmful and unpredictable things.
 an act of fucking, sex.
 a person who fucks, a fucker. It can sometimes have a positive description for a person who is considered wealthy, cool, brave or confident. 
 a motherfucker. It can be used as a term of admiration which may describe a wealthy, cool or confident person. 
 to fuck.
 I fucked your mother! 
 I fucked your mouth!
 I fucked your pussy! 
 I fucked your ass! 
 to fuck, to stick in. Literally "to dig".
 I fucked your mother!
 Keep it (to stingy person)! Literally meaning stick it in your ass.
 jerking off, masturbation. Literally meaning "to shake".
 a fapper. 
 sly person. 
 Are you out of your fucking mind? Literally "are you jerking off?"
 Used to describe a situation when a person is in danger or should expect trouble to happen soon. 
 a blowjob. Literally meaning "taking it in the mouth".
 horny.  Literally meaning "unchained". Used only for describing women.
 horny. Literally meaning "one in heat". Used for describing men.
 to come, ejaculate. Literally means "finish".
 I'm coming! I'm about to ejaculate!
 I ejaculated on her/him!
 sperm, seed. Sometimes can be used as a term of admiration for a thing or a person that is beautiful, cool or extraordinary.
 Used as a term of admiration for a thing or a person that is extremely beautiful, cool or extraordinary. Also can be used to describe a sly and dangerous person.
 one ejaculating on another sexual partner.
 one ejaculating on another sexual partner.
 one ejaculating inside another sexual partner's pussy, anus or mouth.
 derogatory description of foreigners, especially Asians, who visit Georgia.

Other expressions
 slut, whore.
 holy fuck!
 a despicable person. Literally "son of a slut".
 a despicable person. 
 a despicable person. Literally "one that used to be a slut".
 bitch.
 a despicable person. Literally "son of a dog".
 a despicable person. Literally "son of a pig".
 greedy person. Literally "pig".
 derogatory way of referring to Russians. Literally meaning "Russian pig".
 derogatory way of referring to Russia. Literally meaning "country of Russian pig". 
 a despicable person. Literally "son of a donkey".
 used for criticizing youngsters for misbehavior by the elderly. Literally "you're a monkey, son of a donkey".
 Literally meaning "your parents are dogs" is used to describe a despicable person.
 Literally meaning "your father is a dog" is used to describe a despicable person.
 a loser, person who fails frequently and is unsuccessful in life. Word comes from Hebrew goy.
 God damn you!

References

Bibliography 
Friedman, V. (1988) Elementary Georgian Obscenity. Maledicta, Vol. 10

Further reading 
Georgian Dictionary: Slang, Pseudonyms, etc. National Parliamentary Library of Georgia 

Georgian language
Profanity by language
Sexual slang